= Greek Scriptures =

Greek Scriptures may refer to:

- The New Testament
- A translation of any Scripture into the Greek language, but especially the Septuagint translation of the Hebrew Scriptures, or Old Testament
